Calvi – Sainte-Catherine Airport  is an airport located 6 km southeast of Calvi, a commune of the Haute-Corse department in France, on the island of Corsica.

Airlines and destinations
The following airlines operate regular scheduled and charter flights at Calvi – Sainte-Catherine Airport:

Statistics

References

External links 
Calvi Airport (official site) 
Aéroport de Calvi (official site) 
Aéroport de Calvi - Sainte-Catherine at Union des Aéroports Français 

Airports in Corsica
Buildings and structures in Haute-Corse